Violetta Parisini (born Vienna, Austria in 1980) is an Austrian pop singer and songwriter.

Parisini completed her studies in philosophy and theater studies. She started DJing and singing in clubs in the mid-2000s, mainly in Austria and Germany and took part in various productions. She was featured in Mieze Medusa & Tenderboy song "Nicht meine Revolution"  that won the Protestsong contest in 2007. After several EPs, she released her solo album on 28 May 2010 titled Giving You My Heart to Mend in collaboration with musician and Florian Cojocaru. The same year, she was nominated for Best Pop / Rock artists during the Amadeus Austrian Music Awards 2010 nominations and for the FM4 Awards. She also was featured in The24seven's "Stand Still" in 2009 Struboskop's release "Don't Stop Robot" in 2010.

She was the opening act for Joe Cocker's tour in Austria and Germany, accompanied by a band that included Florian Cojocaru on guitar, Pohn Alex on drums, and Parisini on piano. In 2011, she was a vocalist at the singer at the Slow Club Revisited, a band project, in which Wolfgang Schlögl and Thomas Rabitsch continued the idea of their earlier group known as The Slow Club, that had stopped after the death of the project's singer Hansi Lang.  This was followed by the album Open Secrets in 2012.

Discography

Albums

EPs
2010: Stop
2010: Faces & People
2010: The Blackest Coffee
2010: On You
2011: Auf den Dächern: Violetta Parisini (live on tape.tv) (download album)

References

External links

21st-century Austrian women singers
Austrian songwriters
1980 births
Living people